Deltaspis tumacacorii is a species of beetle in the family Cerambycidae. It was described by Knull in 1944.

References

Deltaspis
Beetles described in 1944